Eueides lybia, the lybia longwing, is a butterfly of the family Nymphalidae. It was described by Johan Christian Fabricius in 1775. It is found from Central America to northern South America, from Nicaragua to Bolivia.

Adults feed on flower nectar of Lantana and Psiguria species. They spend most of the time in the forest canopy.

The larvae feed on solitarily Passiflora vitifolia. They are black with white patches on the thorax and anal segment and a yellowish stripe along the sides. The head is black. Pupation takes place in a white pupa which is suspended by the cremaster from a leaf.

Subspecies
Eueides lybia lybia (Suriname)
Eueides lybia lybioides Staudinger, 1876 (Costa Rica, Panama)
Eueides lybia olympia (Fabricius, 1793) (Nicaragua to Colombia)
Eueides lybia orinocensis Brown & Fernández, 1985 (Venezuela)
Eueides lybia otelloi Brown & Fernández, 1985 (Venezuela)
Eueides lybia salcedoi Brown & Fernández, 1985 (Venezuela)

References

Butterflies described in 1775
Heliconiini
Nymphalidae of South America
Taxa named by Johan Christian Fabricius